Teresa Díaz II de Haro (born before 1254) was a Spanish noblewoman and a lady of Biscay, and one of five children of Diego López III de Haro, the Lord of Biscay, and Constanza de Bearne. Her maternal grandparents were the viscount Guillermo II de Bearne and his wife, Garsenda of Provence. Her paternal grandparents were Lope Díaz II de Haro, also Lord of Biscay, and of Urraca Alfonso de León, the illegitimate daughter of King Alfonso IX of León. Amongst her siblings were Diego Lopez V de Haro and Maria II Diaz de Haro.

Biography 
Teresa married Juan Núñez I de Lara around 1270 after his first wife, Teresa Álvarez de Azagra died. Juan Núñez was the head of the House of Lara after the death of his father Nuño González de Lara el Bueno in 1275. He also held title of lordship over Lerma, Amaya, Dueñas, Palenzuela, Tordehumos, Torrelobatón and the Castle of La Mota and inherited the title of Lord of Albarracín from his first wife and held all these titles until his death in 1294.

Her date of death is unknown.

Marriage and descendants 
Teresa had four children with Juan Núñez I de Lara: 
 
 Juan Núñez II de Lara (c. 1276–1315). Succeeded his father as head of the House of Lara and as Señorío de Albarracín.  He was married three times without leaving behind any heirs.
 Nuño González de Lara (c. 1284–1296). He was lieutenant of King Ferdinand IV of Castile. He married Constanza de Portugal y Manuel, daughter of Alfonso of Portugal and granddaughter of King Alfonso III of Portugal. He died in 1296 leaving behind no heirs.
 Juana Núñez de Lara (1285–1351). Married Enrique de Castilla "el Senador" in 1299. He was son of King Ferdinand III of Castile. After that marriage, she was married a second time to Fernando de la Cerda (1275–1322), son of Fernando de la Cerda, Crown prince of Castile and nephew of Alfonso X de Castilla.  This marriage bore many children. Her children inherited the head of house Lara.
 Teresa Núñez de Lara y Haro (c. 1280–c. 1314). Married Alfonso de Valencia, son of Juan de Castilla "el de Tarifa" and nephew of King Alfonso X. She died without leaving any heirs.

Ancestry

References

Bibliography 
 Ayala Martínez, Carlos de; Pascal Baresi; Philippe Josserand (2001). Casa de Velázquez. ed. Identidad y representación de la frontera en la España medieval (siglos XI-XIV) (1ª edición). Madrid: Universidad Autónoma de Madrid. . 
 Estepa Díez, Carlos (2006). «Doña Juana Núñez y el señorío de los Lara». Revue interdisciplinaire d’études hispaniques médiévales (París: SEMH-Sorbonne).
 García Fitz, Francisco (2002). Universidad de Sevilla. Servicio de Publicaciones. ed. Relaciones políticas y guerra. La experiencia castellano-leonesa frente al Islam. Siglos XI-XIII (1ª edición). Sevilla: Grafitrés S. L.. . 
 González Jiménez, Manuel. Alfonso X el Sabio (1ª edición). Barcelona: Editorial Ariel S. A.. .
 Ibáñez de Segovia Peralta y Mendoza, Gaspar; Marqués de Mondejar. Joachin Ibarra. ed. Memorias historicas del Rei D. Alonso el Sabio i observaciones a su chronica. Madrid. 
 Loaysa, Jofré de; García Martínez, Antonio. Academia Alfonso X el Sabio, Colección Biblioteca Murciana de bolsillo Nº 27. ed. Crónicas de los Reyes de Castilla Fernando III, Alfonso X, Sancho IV y Fernando IV (1248–1305). latín y castellano (2ª edición). Murcia. .
 Masnata y de Quesada, David E. (1985). «La Casa Real de la Cerda». Estudios Genealógicos y Heráldicos (Madrid: Asociación Española de Estudios Genealógicos y Heráldicos) (1):  pp. 169–229. .
 Rodríguez García, Francisco (2002). Crónica del Señorío de Vizcaya (1ª edición). Editorial Maxtor Librería. 
 Salazar y Castro, Luis de (1697). Mateo de Llanos y Guzmán. ed. Historia genealógica de la Casa de Lara. Volumen 3. Madrid. 
  Sánchez de Mora, Antonio; La nobleza castellana en la plena Edad Media: el linaje de Lara (ss. XI-XIII); Tesis Doctoral en el Departamento de Historia Medieval y Ciencias y Técnicas Historiográficas, Facultad de Geografía e Historia; Universidad de Sevilla (España); 2003. Critical revision, based on documents and socio-economic analysis of the deeds of the House of Lara.

See also 
 House of Haro
 House of Lara

External links 
 

Lords of Biscay
Teresa Diaz 02
Year of birth uncertain
Year of death unknown
13th-century Castilians
13th-century Spanish women